Kasara (station code: KSRA/N for North (local)) is a railway station on the Central line of the Mumbai Suburban Railway network. It is the final stop in the north-east sector of the Central Line.

Background 
Kasara was called Kassarah during the British Raj. For outstation trains, it is a technical halt, where bankers (generally WAG-5 or WAG-7) are attached behind the trains to enable it to cross the tough and high gradient Kasara Ghat. Earlier the station was electrified with a DC 1.5 kV traction system, but on 19 February 2006, it was changed to an AC 25 kV 50 Hz system.

Services 
It takes up to 162 minutes for slow local suburban trains to reach Kasara from Chhatrapati Shivaji Terminus whereas the fast locals take 136 mins.

Connections 

Connections

References

External links

Railway stations in Thane district
Kalyan-Igatpuri rail line
Mumbai Suburban Railway stations